Jannillea Glasgow is a West Indian cricketer. In April 2021, Glasgow was named in Cricket West Indies' high-performance training camp in Antigua. In June 2021, Glasgow was named in the West Indies A Team for their series against Pakistan.

International career
In January 2022, Glasgow was named in the West Indies' Women's One Day International (WODI) squad for their series against South Africa. In February 2022, she was named as one of three reserve players in the West Indies team for the 2022 Women's Cricket World Cup in New Zealand.

On 30 January 2023, it was announced that Glasgow had been added to the West Indies squad for the 2022–23 South Africa women's Tri-Nation Series. She made her Twenty20 International debut later that day, against India at Buffalo Park, East London in South Africa.

References

External links
 

Year of birth missing (living people)
Living people
Saint Vincent and the Grenadines cricketers
Place of birth missing (living people)
Windward Islands women cricketers
Trinbago Knight Riders (WCPL) cricketers